Tmesisternus rufipes is a species of beetle in the family Cerambycidae. It was described by Blanchard in 1853.

References

rufipes
Beetles described in 1853